Illinois Lutheran High School, or ILHS, is a private, nationally accredited Christian school in Crete, Illinois, a south suburb of Chicago. 

Illinois Lutheran High School serves students from the south, central and eastern region of Will County. This includes Crete, Monee, Wilmington, Peotone, and Washington townships in Will County.

References

External links

 Schools in Will County, Illinois
 public schools in Illinois
Secondary schools affiliated with the Wisconsin Evangelical Lutheran Synod